The Basmane–Söke Regional, numbered B39, is a  long regional passenger train operated by the Turkish State Railways, running from Basmane Terminal in İzmir to the town of Söke. The train operates daily in each direction, heading to İzmir in the morning and returning to Söke in the evening. Schedulled journey time is 2 hours and 28 minutes.

The northbound train departs Söke at 5:55 while the southbound train departs Basmane Terminal at 19:25.

Izmir-Soke
Passenger rail transport in Turkey
Transport in İzmir Province
Transport in Aydın Province
İzmir
Gaziemir District
Torbalı District
Söke District